What Are You Lookin' At? is the debut album by Rockell, released on Robbins Entertainment on April 28, 1998.  It includes the hit singles "I Fell in Love", "In a Dream", "Can't We Try" (featuring Collage) and "When I'm Gone".

Track listing

Chart positions
Album - Billboard (North America)

References

1998 debut albums
Rockell albums